The slender-billed oriole (Oriolus tenuirostris) is a species of bird in the family Oriolidae found from the eastern Himalayas to Southeast Asia.

Its natural habitats are subtropical or tropical moist lowland forests and subtropical or tropical moist montane forests.

Taxonomy and systematics

Subspecies
Two subspecies are recognized: 
 O. t. invisus - Riley, 1940: Found in southern Vietnam
 O. t. tenuirostris - Blyth, 1846: Found from the eastern Himalayas to southern China and central Vietnam

References

slender-billed oriole
Birds of Bhutan
Birds of Northeast India
Birds of Yunnan
Birds of Myanmar
Birds of Laos
Birds of Vietnam
slender-billed oriole
slender-billed oriole
Taxonomy articles created by Polbot